Monte Priora is a mountain of Marche, Italy, representing the third highest peak in the group of Sibillini Mountains, after Mount Vettore and Cima del Redentore (Italian for The Redeemer's Peak). Mount Priora's summit is also known as Pizzo della Regina (Peak of the Queen).

Mountains of Marche
Mountains of the Apennines